Sulzer, Alaska is a ghost town on Prince of Wales Island in the U.S. state of Alaska. The community centered on a copper mine established by William Sulzer on the shore of Hetta Inlet. Operated by the Alaska Consolidated Mining and Smelting Company, the Jumbo Mine was active from 1907 to 1918 and was one of Alaska's largest copper producers.

Charles August Sulzer, brother of William and delegate to the United States Congress from the Territory of Alaska, lived in Sulzer when he took ill in April 1919 and died while on board a boat en route to Ketchikan.

References

Geography of Prince of Wales–Hyder Census Area, Alaska
Ghost towns in Alaska
Mining communities in Alaska
Ghost towns in North America
Ghost towns in the United States
Towns in the United States